Brett Charles Callighen (born May 15, 1953) is a Canadian retired professional ice hockey forward who played 213 games in the World Hockey Association (WHA), followed by 160 games in the National Hockey League (NHL). He played for the New England Whalers and Edmonton Oilers. He was Wayne Gretzky's first regular left winger.

Playing career
Callighen was playing with the Oilers when they were one of the four WHA teams to move into the NHL for the 1979–80 NHL season. On October 14, 1979, Callighen along with Blair MacDonald assisted on Gretzky's first NHL goal. During that season, on 24 February, Callighen suffered an injury to his left eye when it was clipped by Brad McCrimmon's stick, causing Callighen to miss the remainder of that season. Callighen had repeated surgeries, but was declared legally blind in that eye. He played in only portions of the Oilers' 1980–81 and 1981–82 seasons, followed by a few games over the next four years with top-tier European teams HC Lugano and Vienna EV and AHL team Adirondack Red Wings.

Hockey agent
Upon retiring from hockey, Callighen began working as a hockey agent, co-running Optima World Sports with former Oilers teammate Ron Chipperfield, sending players to Europe and Asia, including Switzerland, Germany, Austria, Sweden and Republic of Korea.

His clientele over the years have included Curtis Brown, Mark Hartigan, Todd Warriner, Jon Sim, Matt Higgins, Brad Fast and Jeff Toms among others.

Career statistics

References

External links 

1953 births
Living people
Adirondack Red Wings players
Canadian ice hockey forwards
Dallas Black Hawks players
Edmonton Oilers (WHA) players
Edmonton Oilers players
HC Lugano players
Ice hockey people from Toronto
New England Whalers players
Undrafted National Hockey League players